The Lost World is a 2001 British made-for-television film adaptation of the 1912 novel of the same name by Arthur Conan Doyle, directed by Stuart Orme and adapted by Tony Mulholland and Adrian Hodges. It was filmed at various locations on the West Coast of New Zealand. The 145-minute film was divided into two 75-minute episodes when broadcast on BBC One on 25 and 26 December 2001, receiving 8.68 million and 6.98 million viewers respectively. Bob Hoskins played Professor Challenger and was supported by James Fox, Peter Falk, Matthew Rhys, Tom Ward and Elaine Cassidy.

Plot

Part 1
While in the Amazon rainforest, Professor George Challenger shoots an animal he believes to be a pterosaur. Returning to England, Challenger crashes a lecture at the Natural History Museum held by his rival, Professor Leo Summerlee. Challenger proposes an expedition to discover the home of the pterosaur, but is dismissed by the science community. However, hunter Lord John Roxton, and Daily Gazette columnist Edward Malone both volunteer to join and finance the expedition. A sceptical Summerlee also joins.

On the voyage to South America, Challenger reveals a map created by a Portuguese man named Father Luis Mendoz leading to a remote Brazilian plateau where he encountered dinosaurs during a previous expedition. They travel to a Christian mission in the Amazon, meeting Agnes Clooney and her uncle Reverend Theo Kerr, who condemns Charles Darwin's theory of evolution. Roxton immediately takes a liking to Agnes' unladylike behaviour and flirts with her. Agnes volunteers to join the expedition as a translator. However, in the jungle, the expedition's porters flee out of superstition, but Kerr arrives, repeatedly trying to convince the bull-headed Challenger to turn back.

They reach the edge of the plateau and find a cave concealing a pathway to the plateau but discover a blockage. They later find a gorge leading straight to the plateau, using a tree as a substitute bridge. However, when all but Kerr make it across, he suddenly knocks the tree into the gorge and leaves Challenger and the others stranded. Venturing in the plateau's jungle, they find several species of dinosaur, a flock of pterosaurs, and a strange species of aggressive, carnivorous ape men. Malone finds a lake which he names after his fiancé Gladys. Malone and Agnes are chased by an Allosaurus, but evade it when it falls into a manmade trap.

Part 2 
Escaping the trap, Edward and Agnes find Roxton at the lake, learning the apes kidnapped Challenger and Summerlee. Warriors from an indigenous tribe appear, aiding them in rescuing the professors, along with Achille, the son of their own chieftain. The ape men are taken captive by the tribe.

Arriving at the village, the tribe are revealed to be surviving members of Mendoz's expedition and mistake Challenger for Mendoz, who taught them Christianity. The chief shows the other end of the cave and reveals it was blocked by a man who visited the tribe, trapping them within the plateau. Roxton falls in love with the chief's daughter Maree, a woman who is quite similar to him, and they eventually marry.

Some time later, the ape men cry out after having to bury one of their children, attracting the attention of two Allosaurs who rampage on the tribe. In the mayhem, the chief is killed, as well as several other tribe members, but Malone and Roxton successfully slay the dinosaurs. At the same time, Summerlee reopens the cave using explosives, allowing the explorers to flee the village when Achille condemns them. Roxton is stabbed by one of the ape men, but buys time for the others to leave. Roxton seemingly succumbs to his wounds and is mourned by the villagers.

Challenger, Summerlee, Malone, and Agnes return to the Amazon but encounter a crazed Kerr and realise he sealed the cave to prevent anyone from finding it, believing it to be forged by Satan because of the ape-men. When Kerr produces a revolver, Summerlee wrestles him for it, only for Kerr to be shot and killed by accident. The expedition porters later find the survivors. Returning to London, Malone discovers Gladys has become engaged to another man, however he is glad, as he realises that he has developed feelings for Agnes. At Challenger's press event, he unveils a juvenile Pteranodon he picked up as an egg. However, the excited crowd scare the Pteranodon out of a window. Malone and Summerlee convince Challenger to pretend the whole expedition was a lie to protect the plateau's inhabitants from destruction, sacrificing his reputation and success for the safety of the Dinosaurs and the villagers. Summerlee stays with his family, Challenger sets off to find Atlantis, while Malone and Agnes admit their love for each other, and Malone decides to pursue a career as a novelist. In a final scene, Roxton is revealed to be alive and living with Maree and the villagers in peace.

Cast

Animals
The prehistoric animals cgi model were used in the Walking with... throughout the film, while the Ape Men were performed by actors in costumes.

Prehistoric animals

Dinosaurs 
 Allosaurus − A well known theropod from the late Jurassic North America more than 150 million years ago. The same CG model was later used in the Walking with Monsters series.
 Brachiosaurus − A massive sauropod from the late Jurassic Morrison Formation 150 million years ago. It uses the same CG model from the Walking with Dinosaurs series.
 Diplodocus − A huge 67 to 75 foot long sauropod from the late Jurassic Morrison Formation 150 million years ago. It uses the same CG models (adult and baby) from the Walking with Dinosaurs series.
 Hypsilophodon − A small herbivorous ornithopod from the early Cretaceous Europe 130 million years ago. This is the first prehistoric creature which is found by Challenger's team in the plateau.
 Iguanodon − A giant herbivore from the Cretaceous Europe, Asia, and North America. Professor Summerlee thought these creatures were built as kangaroos on two legs and their tail kept on the ground, but this idea is debunked when he sees the quadrupedal animals. It uses the same CG model from the Walking with Dinosaurs series.

Reptiles 
 Pteranodon − A large flying fish-eating pterosaur from North America during the late Cretaceous period. This creature is the only proof from Challenger's very first expedition, and later he named the species as "Pteranodon sumerleensis". The same CG model is later used in Chased by Dinosaurs: Land of Giants and Sea Monsters Episode 3.

According to Christopher Hall and Stuart Orme on the DVD audio commentary, Tim Haines requested that there be a scene in the lake where prehistoric sea reptiles appeared, but this was ultimately cut due to difficulty of underwater filming and actress Elaine Cassidy not being a good swimmer.

Mammals 
 Java Man − An ape-man originally called Pithecanthropus erectus, today classified as Homo erectus, is a primitive hominid from Asia during the early Pleistocene epoch 2 million years ago. This creature is described as the missing link between primates and humans. In the film an undiscovered species appear, and Challenger named them "Pithecanthropus challengeris".
 Entelodon − A strange, pig-themed, rhino-sized, omnivorous cousin for hippos and whales from the Oligocene and Miocene Asia. This is the only prehistoric mammal in the film besides the Pithecanthropus. It uses the same CG model from the Walking with Beasts series.

Modern day animals 
 Southern coral snake − A venomous snake from the rainforests of South America.
 Brazilian black tarantula − A venomous spider which lives in the South American jungles, but sometimes travels to the village to hunt insects or reptiles.
 Atlas moth − A large moth from the tropical and subtropical forests of Southeast Asia and Indonesia. Professor Sumerlee found the moth while a Pteranodon carries away the team's dinner.
 Scarlet macaw − A large and colourful macaw from the American tropics of south-eastern Mexico to the rainforests of Peru, Bolivia and Brazil. It is a more than 80-centimetre-long bird with a weight of about 1 kilogram, and is one of the smartest birds on Earth.
 Brown capuchin − A small New World monkey from the tropical rainforests of the Amazon basin.

Home media
The Lost World was released on home video as a single 145-minute instalment. The series was released on VHS and DVD in the United Kingdom on 3 June 2002; The DVD version contains a 5.1 soundtrack, audio commentary with Stuart Orme and Christopher Hall and the 29-minute documentary Inside The Lost World. An American DVD release followed on 29 October 2002, presented in 4:3 pan and scan format with a stereo soundtrack. This release also contained the 90-minute History Channel documentary Dinosaur Secrets Revealed and a 21-minute documentary on the making of the series.

Reception

John Leonard TV critic for New York magazine praised the special effects for the time, saying "New Zealand looks like Brazil, and the beasts are the best ever on a small screen." Writing for DVD Talk, Holly E Ordway described the series as "a straightforward and entertaining adventure story", praising the modernised changes made to the book's storyline but calling the characters "caricatures".

References

External links
 The official BBC Drama site
 
 
 

2001 television films
2001 films
British television films
British fantasy adventure films
Films about dinosaurs
2000s fantasy adventure films
2001 drama films
Professor Challenger films
2000s English-language films
2000s British films